The 1989 Kent Cup was an invitational non-ranking snooker tournament held in Beijing from 20 to 23 April 1989. Sakchai Sim-Ngam won the event, defeating Franky Chan 4–1 in the final. The tournament was promoted by Pro-Tex Sports Management, a Hong Kong company, working with the China Billiards and Snooker Association.

The event features a total prize fund of US$25,000 and US$8,000 awarded to the winner. This was a significant reduction from the previous year's total prize fund of £120,000. John Parrott was the defending champion, but he was not eligible for this year's edition, as it was held exclusively for the players from the Asia–Pacific region. The invited competitors were sixteen players from eight different countries – Australia, China, Hong Kong, New Zealand, Philippines, Singapore, Taiwan and Thailand.

Main draw

References

Kent Cup (snooker)
Kent Cup
Kent Cup